Pontibacter lucknowensis  is a Gram-negative, rod-shaped, aerobic and motile bacterium from the genus of Pontibacter which has been isolated from hexachlorocyclohexane contaminated soil in Lucknow in India.

References

External links
Type strain of Pontibacter lucknowensis at BacDive -  the Bacterial Diversity Metadatabase

Cytophagia
Bacteria described in 2013